Moscow Five is a Russian esports organization founded in 2001. The organization currently has a professional League of Legends team. On 16 December 2011, Moscow Five created what one could describe as one of the most successful international teams in the history of League of Legends. In 2013 former Moscow Five owner Dmitry "ddd1ms" Smilianets was arrested for his alleged involvement in "one of the largest" hacking and data breach schemes history in a global operation by the FBI's Cyber Division. Moscow Five's League of Legends team quickly reformed as Gambit Gaming under Pikiner's leadership.

Moscow Five returned to the professional League of Legends scene in 2014 and 2019 with new CIS teams.

Counter-Strike 

Moscow Five's Counter-Strike team won bronze at the 2011 World Cyber Games.

League of Legends

Former EU LCS roster

Notable achievements 
 3rd–4th — Season 2 World Championship
 1st — IEM Season VI - World Championship

References

External links 
 

2001 establishments in Russia
Esports teams based in Russia
Defunct and inactive Dota teams
Defunct and inactive Counter-Strike teams
Former European League of Legends Championship Series teams
Former League of Legends Continental League teams
Moscow Five players
Esports teams established in 2001